Robert Roy Weatherill (20 July 1897 – 18 July 1992) was an Australian rules footballer who played in the VFL between 1917 and 1923 for the Richmond Football Club.

References

 Hogan P: The Tigers Of Old, Richmond FC, Melbourne 1996

External links

Bob Weatherill's playing statistics from The VFA Project

Richmond Football Club players
Richmond Football Club Premiership players
Coburg Football Club players
Coburg Football Club coaches
Prahran Football Club players
Australian rules footballers from Melbourne
1897 births
1992 deaths
Two-time VFL/AFL Premiership players
People from Hawthorn, Victoria